Upper Grinnell Lake is located in Glacier National Park, in the U. S. state of Montana. Upper Grinnell Lake is a proglacial lake which formed in the 1930s as Grinnell Glacier retreated. The lake is often filled with small icebergs which have been breaking off Grinnell Glacier. Upper Grinnell Lake can be reached by trail and is a  hike from the Many Glacier Hotel.

See also
List of lakes in Glacier County, Montana

References

Lakes of Glacier National Park (U.S.)
Lakes of Glacier County, Montana